Vajrasana (Sanskrit for "diamond seat" or "diamond throne") may refer to:

 The Vajrasana, Bodh Gaya, India where Gautama Buddha achieved enlightenment
 Vajrasana (yoga), an asana in yoga